Namdar (also Romanized as Nāmdār; also known as Sūreh Darreh) is a village in Osmanvand Rural District, Firuzabad District, Kermanshah County, Kermanshah Province, Iran. At the 2006 census, its population was 16, in 4 families.

References 

Populated places in Kermanshah County